The Lincoln County School District is a public school district in the U.S. state of Oregon.  The district serves the communities of Yachats, Waldport, Eddyville, Newport, Siletz, Lincoln City and Toledo. The district spans roughly 55 miles of the central Oregon Coast from Cascade Head south to Cape Perpetua, and encompasses about 1,000 square miles.

Demographics
Over half of the students in the district qualify for free or reduced lunch.

In the 2009 school year, the district had 484 students classified as homeless by the Department of Education, which was 9.0% of students in the district.

High schools
 Lincoln City Career Technical High School (Lincoln City)
 Newport High School (Newport)
 Taft High School (Lincoln City)
 Toledo High School (Toledo)
 Waldport High School (Waldport)

Middle/junior high schools
 Crestview Heights School (Waldport) (K-8)
 Isaac Newton Magnet School (shares campus with Newport Intermediate School)
 Newport Preparatory Academy (shares campus with Newport High School)
 Taft Middle School (shares campus with Taft High School)
 Toledo Junior High School (shares campus with Toledo High School)

Elementary schools
 Newport Intermediate School (Newport) (4-6)
 Oceanlake Elementary School (Lincoln City) (K-2)
 Sam Case Elementary (Newport) (K-3)
 Taft Elementary School (Lincoln City) (3-6)
 Toledo Elementary School (Toledo) (K-6)

Contracts
As of 2011, Lincoln Country School District contracts with Sodexo for custodial and food services, and (as of 2019/2020 school year) with First Student for transportation services.

References

Education in Lincoln County, Oregon
School districts in Oregon
1923 establishments in Oregon
School districts established in 1923